Anwar Sadat, the 3rd President of Egypt, was assassinated on 6 October 1981 during the annual victory parade held in Cairo to celebrate Operation Badr, during which the Egyptian Army had crossed the Suez Canal and taken back a small part of the Sinai Peninsula from Israel at the beginning of the Yom Kippur War. The assassination was undertaken by members of the Egyptian Islamic Jihad.

Background
Following the Camp David Accords, Sadat and Israeli Prime Minister Menachem Begin shared the 1978 Nobel Peace Prize. However, the subsequent 1979 Egypt–Israel Peace Treaty was received with controversy among Arab nations, particularly the Palestinians. Egypt's membership in the Arab League was suspended (and not reinstated until 1989). PLO Leader Yasser Arafat said "Let them sign what they like. False peace will not last." In Egypt, various jihadist groups, such as Egyptian Islamic Jihad and al-Jama'a al-Islamiyya, used the Camp David Accords to rally support for their cause. Previously sympathetic to Sadat's attempt to integrate them into Egyptian society, Egypt's Islamists now felt betrayed, and publicly called for the overthrow of the Egyptian president and the replacement of the nation's system of government with a government based on Islamic theocracy. 

The last months of Sadat's presidency were marked by internal uprising. He dismissed allegations that the rioting was incited by domestic issues, believing that the Soviet Union was recruiting its regional allies in Libya and Syria to incite an uprising that would eventually force him out of power. Following a failed military coup in June 1981, Sadat ordered a major crackdown that resulted in the arrest of numerous opposition figures. Though he still maintained high levels of popularity in Egypt, it has been said that he was assassinated "at the peak" of his unpopularity.

Egyptian Islamic Jihad
Earlier in Sadat's presidency, Islamists had benefited from the "rectification revolution" and the release from prison of activists jailed under Gamal Abdel Nasser, but his Sinai treaty with Israel enraged Islamists, particularly the radical Egyptian Islamic Jihad. According to interviews and information gathered by journalist Lawrence Wright, the group was recruiting military officers and accumulating weapons, waiting for the right moment to launch "a complete overthrow of the existing order" in Egypt. Chief strategist of El-Jihad was Abbud al-Zumar, a colonel in the military intelligence whose "plan was to kill the main leaders of the country, capture the headquarters of the army and State Security, the telephone exchange building, and of course the radio and television building, where news of the Islamic revolution would then be broadcast, unleashing—he expected—a popular uprising against secular authority all over the country."

In February 1981, Egyptian authorities were alerted to El-Jihad's plan by the arrest of an operative carrying crucial information. In September, Sadat ordered a highly unpopular roundup of more than 1,500 people, including many Jihad members, but also the Coptic Pope and other Coptic clergy, intellectuals and activists of all ideological stripes. All non-government press was banned as well. The roundup missed a jihad cell in the military led by Lieutenant Khalid Islambouli, who would succeed in assassinating Anwar Sadat that October.

According to Tala'at Qasim, ex-head of the Gama'a Islamiyya interviewed in Middle East Report, it was not Islamic Jihad but his organization, known in English as the "Islamic Group", that organized the assassination and recruited the assassin (Islambouli). Members of the Group's "Majlis el-Shura" ("Consultative Council")—headed by the famed "blind shaykh"—were arrested two weeks before the killing, but they did not disclose the existing plans, and Islambouli succeeded in assassinating Sadat.

Assassination

On 6 October 1981, a victory parade was held in Cairo to commemorate the eighth anniversary of Egypt's crossing of the Suez Canal during the Yom Kippur War. Sadat was protected by four layers of security and eight bodyguards, and the army parade should have been safe due to ammunition-seizure rules. As Egyptian Air Force Mirage jets flew overhead, distracting the crowd, Egyptian Army soldiers and troop trucks towing artillery paraded by. One truck contained the assassination squad, led by Lieutenant Khalid Islambouli. As it passed the tribune, Islambouli forced the driver at gunpoint to stop. From there, the assassins dismounted and Islambouli approached Sadat with three hand grenades concealed under his helmet. Sadat stood to receive his salute; Anwar's nephew Talaat El Sadat later said, "The president thought the killers were part of the show when they approached the stands firing, so he stood saluting them", whereupon Islambouli threw all his grenades at Sadat, only one of which exploded (but fell short), and additional assassins exited the truck, firing into the stands until they had exhausted their ammunition, and then attempted to flee. After Sadat was hit and fell to the ground, people threw chairs around him to shield him from the hail of bullets.

The attack lasted about two minutes. Sadat and ten others were killed outright or suffered fatal wounds, including Major General Hassan Allam, Khalfan Nasser Mohammed (a general from the Omani delegation), Eng. Samir Helmy Ibrahim, Al Anba' Samuel, Mohammed Yousuf Rashwan (the presidential photographer), Saeed Abdel Raouf Bakr, Chinese engineer , as well as the Cuban ambassador to Egypt, and a Coptic Orthodox bishop, Anba Samuel of Social and Ecumenical Services.

Twenty-eight were wounded, including Vice President Hosni Mubarak, Irish Defence Minister James Tully, and four United States Armed Forces liaison officers. Security forces were momentarily stunned, but reacted within 45 seconds. The Swedish ambassador Olov Ternström managed to escape unhurt. Egyptian state television, which was broadcasting the parade live, quickly cut to military music and Quranic recitations. One of the attackers was killed, and the three others injured and arrested. Sadat was airlifted to a military hospital, and died nearly two hours later. Sadat's death was attributed to "violent nervous shock and internal bleeding in the chest cavity, where the left lung and major blood vessels below it were torn."

Aftermath

In conjunction with the assassination, an insurrection was organized in Asyut in Upper Egypt. Rebels took control of the city for a few days, and 68 policemen and soldiers were killed in the fighting. Government control was not restored until paratroopers from Cairo arrived. Most of the militants convicted of fighting received light sentences and served only three years in prison. The assassination was generally greeted with enthusiasm from governments in the Islamic world, which regarded Sadat as a traitor for the Egypt–Israel peace treaty. The state newspaper of Syria, Tishreen, carried the headline "Egypt Today Bids Farewell to the Ultimate Traitor," while Iran named a street in Tehran after Islambouli. President Siad Barre of Somalia and President Jaafar Nimeiry of Sudan, along with deposed Iranian Crown Prince Reza Pahlavi, were the only Muslim political leaders to attend Sadat's funeral.

Burial
Sadat was buried in the Unknown Soldier Memorial, located in the Nasr City district of Cairo. The inscription on his grave reads: "The hero of war and peace". The funeral was attended by three former Presidents of the United States—Richard Nixon, Gerald R. Ford, Jimmy Carter—as well as Israeli Prime Minister Menachem Begin, French President François Mitterrand, West German Chancellor Helmut Schmidt, Italian President Sandro Pertini, Irish President Patrick Hillery, Spanish Prime Minister Leopoldo Calvo-Sotelo, and King Baudouin of Belgium. The sitting U.S. President Ronald Reagan, who had survived an assassination attempt of his own several months prior, opted not to attend because of the tense political situation, although his administration would be represented by Secretary of State Alexander Haig, Secretary of Defense Caspar Weinberger, and Ambassador to the United Nations Jeane Kirkpatrick. Stevie Wonder and Walter Cronkite also attended. 

At first, Sadat was succeeded by Sufi Abu Taleb as Acting President of Egypt for eight days until 14 October 1981, when Sadat's Vice President, Hosni Mubarak, became the new Egyptian President for nearly 30 years until his resignation as a result of the Egyptian Revolution of 2011.

Assassins
Islambouli and the other assassins were tried, found guilty, and sentenced to death. They were executed on 15 April 1982, two army men by firing squad and three civilians by hanging.

See also 

 Assassination of Yitzhak Rabin

References

Citations

Bibliography

External links

 https://www.nytimes.com/2010/09/12/world/middleeast/12egypt.html?pagewanted=all

1980s in Cairo
1981 mass shootings in Africa
1981 murders in Egypt
1980s trials
20th-century mass murder in Africa
Assassination
Assassinations in Egypt
Deaths by person in Africa
Filmed assassinations
Islamic terrorism in Cairo
Islamic terrorist incidents in the 1980s
Mass murder in 1981
Mass murder in Cairo
Mass shootings in Egypt
Military parades
Murder trials
October 1981 crimes
October 1981 events in Africa
Politics of Egypt
Republic of Egypt
Terrorist incidents in Cairo
Terrorist incidents in Egypt in 1981
Trials in Egypt